Frank Barton may refer to:
Frank Barton (English footballer) (born 1947), English football midfielder
Frank Barton (Australian footballer) (1900–1983), Australian rules footballer
Frank Barton (rugby league), English rugby league footballer of the 1940s and 1950s